Willis George Emerson (1856–1918) was an American novelist, Chicago newspaperman, lawyer, politician, and promoter, who formed the North American Copper Company in Wyoming. He founded the town of Encampment, Wyoming.

Biography
Willis George Emerson was born near Blakesburg, Iowa on March 28, 1856.

He died at his home in Los Angeles on December 10, 1918.

Works
Winning Winds (1885)
Grey Rocks: A tale of the Middle West (1894)
Was It a Crime? "Coin at School" dissected (1900)
Buell Hampton (1902)
The Builders (1906)
The Smoky God or a Voyage to the Inner World (1908)
The Treasure of Hidden Valley (1915)
A Vendetta of the Hills (1917)
The Man who Discovered Himself (1919)

References

External links

 
 
 
 Willis George Emerson at Wyoming Authors

1856 births
1918 deaths
American male writers